Calvetti is an Italian surname. Notable people with this name include:
Daniela Calvetti, Italian-American mathematician
Diego Calvetti, songwriter; see :Category:Songs written by Diego Calvetti
Joe Calvetti, American gymnast for Illinois Fighting Illini men's gymnastics, won 1948 NCAA individual high bar national championship
María Calvetti, Uruguayan shot putter, silver medalist at 1978 South American Youth Championships in Athletics
Paola Calvetti (born 1958), Italian novelist and journalist